The Director of Officiating can refer to a position within several professional sports leagues:
The National Football League has a Director of Officiating
The National Hockey League has a Director of Officiating
The National Basketball Association has a Director of Officiating